The 2004 Asian Men's Junior Handball Championship (9th tournament) took place in Hyderabad from 8 September–17 September. It acts as the Asian qualifying tournament for the 2005 Men's Junior World Handball Championship in Hungary.

Draw

* Withdrew

Preliminary round

Group A

Group B

Placement 5th–10th

9th/10th

7th/8th

5th/6th

Final round

Semifinals

Bronze medal match

Gold medal match

Final standing

References

External links
www.handball.jp (Archived 2009-09-04)

International handball competitions hosted by India
Asian Mens Junior Handball Championship, 2004
Asia
Asian Handball Championships